Bridge and Roof Company (India) Limited is a Central Public Sector Enterprises (CPSE) of the Government of India, based in Kolkata, India. The company began in 1920. Bridge and Roof Co. (India) Ltd., is a construction organization, encompassing industrial and infrastructure sectors in India as well as abroad. It also undertakes EPC and Turnkey contracts.

On 9 February 2017, the Government of India approved the privatization of Bridge and Roof Company.

In 2019, the company completed their 100 years.

In 2022, The Inter-State Bus Terminal (ISBT) project which is being constructed at Baramunda missed its completion deadline again and was given an extension until June this year. The project is now awarded to Bridge and Roof Company for 160.6 crores.

On 4 June 2022, the Transportation Department of Odisha imposed a fine amounting to Rs 2,63,500 on Bridge and Roof Co's truck driver in Bhubaneswar for violating rules. The driver was reportedly driving the truck without a license and tax.

References

External links 
 Bridge and Roof Co. (India) website

Construction and civil engineering companies established in 1920
Construction and civil engineering companies of India
Companies based in Kolkata
Indian companies established in 1920